Sotiris Liberopoulos (born 29 June 1977) is a Greek former professional footballer who played as a goalkeeper.

Biography
Sotiris Liberopoulos was born in Filiatra in western Messinia and began his career from the local team Erani along with his famous cousin Nikos.

Later on, he played with Kalamata where he became one of the most famous players and entered the U-21 team.  With Kalamata, he began his debut in the First Division on 14 January 1996 against Apollon in Rizoupoli.

He also played by transcription with other teams including Ethnikos, AEK, the Belgian team La Louvière, Akratitos, Kastoria and from 2007 with Xanthi.

Career

 1994–1995: Erani Filiatra:
 1995–1997: Kalamata: 14 games
 1997–1998: Ethnikos: 10 games
 1998–2001: Kalamata: 64 games
 2001–2004: AEK: 4 games
 2002–2003: La Louvière (loan): 0 games
 2004–2005: Aris: 20 games
 2005–2006: Akratitos: 10 games
 2006–2007: Kastoria: 21 games
 2007–2013: Xanthi: 31 games
 2013–2014: Kallithea: 13 games
 2014–2015: Ermionida: 8 games

 1997–1998:  U-21: 18 games

References

Ethnospor: 9-3-2007, p 80
Ta Nea: (1-28-2008), p 32

1977 births
Living people
Greek footballers
Greece under-21 international footballers
Greek expatriate footballers
Association football goalkeepers
Kalamata F.C. players
Ethnikos Piraeus F.C. players
AEK Athens F.C. players
Aris Thessaloniki F.C. players
A.P.O. Akratitos Ano Liosia players
Kastoria F.C. players
Xanthi F.C. players
Kallithea F.C. players
R.A.A. Louviéroise players
Super League Greece players
Expatriate footballers in Belgium
People from Filiatra
Footballers from the Peloponnese